Monegal is a Spanish surname that can be part or whole of a Spanish family name. People named Monegal include:

 Emir Rodríguez Monegal (1921–1985), Uruguyan literary critic, editor, writer
 Francisco Fábregas Monegal (born 1977), Spanish hockey midfielder